The 2005 Ohio Bobcats football team represented Ohio University during the 2005 NCAA Division I-A football season. Ohio competed as a member of the Mid-American Conference (MAC) in the East Division. The Bobcats were led by Frank Solich in his first year as head coach.  They played their home games in Peden Stadium in Athens, Ohio.

Schedule

References

Ohio
Ohio Bobcats football seasons
Ohio Bobcats football